The Shyft Group, formerly known as Spartan Motors, is an American automobile design company that designs, engineers and manufactures specialty chassis, specialty vehicles, truck bodies and aftermarket parts for the recreational vehicle (RV), government services, and delivery and service markets. The company started in 1975 as a direct result of the bankruptcy of Diamond Reo. It is currently headquartered in Novi, Michigan and has 3,000 employees.

History
In 1974, Lansing-based Diamond Reo Trucks filed for bankruptcy. The Form-Rite Corporation of Charlotte, Michigan was owed a significant sum by Diamond Reo, which had been Form-Rite's largest client; Form-Rite had supplied fiberglass parts to Reo.  During the bankruptcy hearings, Form-Rite president Charles R. McManamey learned of a significant contract that Reo had just won for custom fire truck chassis.  From connections made through the hearing, McManamey was able to draw together the additional talent and knowledge required to build such trucks, and founded Spartan Motors, Inc. as a wholly owned subsidiary of Form-Rite.

During the establishment of Spartan Motors, manufacturing was set up in Form-Rite's  warehouse at 426 Sumpter Rd. in Charlotte.  Charles McManamey was named Spartan Motors' chairman of the board.  Former Reo vice president of engineering and marketing George W. Sztykiel became Spartan's president.  Ron Partee, former Reo manager of original equipment manufacturing, stepped in as the vice president of sales.  Spartan's vice president of engineering was former Reo director of engineering John Knox.  Kenneth C. McManamey, former Form-Rite production engineer and supervisor, served as Spartan's manager of operations.
 
Sztykiel, Partee, Knox, and Ken McManamey all donated their time to build the first chassis on speculation.  By January 1, 1976, the chassis was completed.  Within weeks it had been sold to FMC in Tipton, Indiana and Spartan had 16 custom fire truck cab & chassis orders as well as an order for a one-of-a-kind 140,000 pound GVW coal carrier.   
 
In March 1976, Spartan Motors employed 12 former Reo employees, including Reo's ex–quality control manager Theodore C. Huff, former staff engineer-chassis at Reo Lawrence E. Karkau, and Gerald L. Geary, who had been assistant manager of truck design at Reo. Spartan was spun-off with its own officers and directors that April. Charles McManamey's sons James and Donald also worked for Spartan Motors, as well as several other part-time workers. The company quickly outgrew the Form-Rite warehouse, and within a few years construction was started for a new facility on Reynolds Road in Charlotte.  The McManameys sold their stock in the company and in 1984 Spartan went public, trading on NASDAQ under the symbol “SPAR”.

Spartan Motors entered the United Kingdom transit bus market in 1995 with the unveiling of its Spartan TX low-floor single-deck bus chassis at Coach & Bus 95, held at the National Exhibition Centre in Birmingham, England. Only two Spartan TX buses were produced, with both being delivered to Barnsley-based Yorkshire Traction by 1996.

In June 2020, Spartan Motors, Inc. announced its corporate name change to The Shyft Group, Inc. following the divestiture of its Emergency Response (ER) business unit. It began trading on NASDAQ under the symbol "SHYF".

In October 2020, Shyft Group acquired the aluminum truck-body manufacturer F3 MFG Inc. based in Waterville, Maine, with its brands DuraMag and Magnum.

Active subsidiaries

Spartan RV Chassis
Spartan RV Chassis engineers, designs, manufactures, sells, and services Class A diesel RV chassis for OEMs such as Entegra Coach, Newmar, Foretravel, and Jayco.

Utilimaster

Utilimaster was acquired in November 2009. It designs, manufacturers, and assembles purpose-built delivery and other vocational trucks.

Strobes-R-Us 
Strobes-R-Us was acquired on December 17, 2018. It is a distributor and installer of specialty vehicle upfits and lighting equipment.

General Truck Body 
General Truck Body was acquired in June 2019 and merged with Utilimaster. It manufactures and assembles refrigerated and non-refrigerated truck bodies.

Royal Truck Body 
Royal Truck Body was acquired on September 20, 2019. It manufactures van bodies and accessories.

DuraMag and Magnum 
On October 1, 2020, Shyft acquired F3 MFG, an aluminum truck body and accessory manufacturer behind the DuraMag Body and Magnum Truck Rack brands. The F3 MFG name was phased out and the DuraMag and Magnum brands were nested under the Shyft Specialty Vehicles business unit.

Blue Arc
Shyft launched Blue Arc EV Solutions in March 2022 to build commercial battery electric delivery vans.

Former subsidiaries

Spartan Emergency Response Vehicles 

Spartan Emergency Response Vehicles (Spartan ERV) is a manufacturer of custom fire engines. After several years of supplying chassis for fire trucks, Spartan acquired fire apparatus body manufacturers Luverne and Quality Manufacturing in the mid-1990s. Luverne used its early expertise in the automotive and heavy truck industries to begin building fire apparatus in 1912. Quality got its start six decades later, catering to the Southern firefighting market. In 2003, Luverne and Quality were consolidated under the names Crimson Fire and Crimson Fire Aerials. In 2011, Classic Fire of Ocala, Florida was acquired and became a new Crimson Fire manufacturing facility for fire trucks. In 2012, Spartan Motors rebranded Crimson Fire as Spartan ERV, a joint venture with Gimaex. In January 2017, Spartan ERV acquired fire apparatus manufacturer Smeal Fire Apparatus, including its subsidiaries Smeal, Ladder Tower Company, and US Tanker. On February 3, 2020, Spartan Motors sold Spartan ERV division to the REV Group, including Spartan Custom Cabs, Smeal Fire Apparatus, Ladder Tower Company, and US Tanker.

Road Rescue 
Road Rescue is a manufacturer of ambulances.  It was sold in 2010 to Allied Specialty Vehicles.

Carpenter Industries 
Carpenter Industries was a manufacturer of school buses, transit buses, and step vans.  Carpenter was founded in 1919; Spartan purchased it in 1998, but closed it down in 2001.

References

External links
 

Vehicle manufacturing companies established in 1975
1975 establishments in Michigan
Auto parts suppliers of the United States
Companies listed on the Nasdaq
Eaton County, Michigan
Truck manufacturers of the United States
Motor vehicle manufacturers based in Michigan